The 2012 Copa del Rey Final was the 110th final since the tournament's establishment (including two seasons where two rival editions were played). The match was contested by Athletic Bilbao and Barcelona on 25 May 2012 at the Vicente Calderón in Madrid. This was the clubs' first meeting in the final since 2009 where Barcelona won the trophy with a 4–1 victory. The same teams, the two with the most cup wins in the history of the competition, also met in the Round of 16 of the 2010–11 edition, in which Barça prevailed on away goals after two draws.

Barcelona lifted the trophy for the 26th time in their history with a 3–0 victory.

Road to the final

Match

See also
Athletic–Barcelona clásico

References

External links

2012
1
FC Barcelona matches
Athletic Bilbao matches
2012 in Madrid